is a railway station in Suginami, Tokyo, Japan, jointly operated by the East Japan Railway Company (JR East) and the Tokyo subway operator Tokyo Metro.

Lines
The JR East station is served by the Chūō Main Line (Chūō Line (Rapid) and Chūō-Sōbu Line local services), and is located 18.7 km from the starting point of the Chūō Line at Tokyo Station.

The station is numbered M-01.

Station layout
The JR East station consists of ground-level platforms running east–west, and the underground platforms for the Tokyo Metro station lie parallel to the JR East platforms, slightly to the south. The station has "North" and "South" ("South a" and "South b") entrances at the eastern end of the station and a "West" entrance at the western end.

JR East

The JR East station has a "Midori no Madoguchi" staffed ticket office and a "View Plaza" travel agent.

Platforms
The station consists of two ground-level island platforms serving four tracks.

Tokyo Metro

The underground Tokyo Metro station consists of an island platform serving two terminating tracks located on the second basement level.

Platforms

History
The JR East station opened on 21 December 1891. The station for the Marunouchi Line opened on 23 January 1962.

The station facilities of the Marunouchi Line were inherited by Tokyo Metro after the privatization of the Teito Rapid Transit Authority (TRTA) in 2004.

Passenger statistics
In fiscal 2013, the JR East station was used by an average of 86,032 passengers daily (boarding passengers only), making it the 48th-busiest station operated by JR East. In fiscal 2013, the Tokyo Metro station was used by an average of 78,484 passengers per day (exiting and entering passengers), making it the 49th-busiest station operated by Tokyo Metro. The daily average passenger figures for each operator in previous years are as shown below.

 Note that JR East figures are for boarding passengers only.

Surrounding area
 Suginami Ward Office
 Ogikubo Tax Office
 Tokyo Adventist Hospital
 Tokyo Ogikubo High School
 Ōtaguro Park

See also
 List of railway stations in Japan

References

External links

 Ogikubo Station information (JR East) 
 Ogikubo Station information (Tokyo Metro) 

Railway stations in Japan opened in 1962
Chūō Main Line
Chūō-Sōbu Line
Tokyo Metro Marunouchi Line
Stations of East Japan Railway Company
Railway stations in Tokyo
Railway stations in Japan opened in 1891